The Initial Teaching Alphabet (I.T.A. or i.t.a.) is a variant of the Latin alphabet developed by Sir James Pitman (the grandson of Sir Isaac Pitman, inventor of a system of shorthand) in the early 1960s. It was not intended to be a strictly phonetic transcription of English sounds, or a spelling reform for English as such, but instead a practical simplified writing system which could be used to teach English-speaking children to read more easily than can be done with traditional orthography. After children had learned to read using I.T.A., they would then eventually move on to learn standard English spelling. Although it achieved a certain degree of popularity in the 1960s, it has fallen out of use.

Details
The I.T.A. originally had 43 symbols, which was expanded to 44, then 45. Each symbol predominantly represented a single English sound (including affricates and diphthongs), but there were complications due to the desire to avoid making the I.T.A. needlessly different from standard English spelling (which would make the transition from the I.T.A. to standard spelling more difficult), and in order to neutrally represent several English pronunciations or dialects. In particular, there was no separate I.T.A. symbol for the English unstressed schwa sound , and schwa was written with the same letters used to write full vowel sounds. Consonants written by double letters or "ck", "tch" etc. sequences in standard spelling were written with multiple symbols in I.T.A.

The I.T.A. symbol set includes joined letters (typographical ligatures) to replace the two-letter digraphs "wh", "sh", and "ch" of conventional writing, and also ligatures for most of the long vowels. There are two distinct ligatures for the voiced and unvoiced "th" sounds in English, and a special merged letter for "ng" resembling ŋ with a loop. There is a variant of the "r" to end syllables, which is silent in non-rhotic accents like Received Pronunciation but not in rhotic accents like General American and Scots English (this was the 44th symbol added to the I.T.A.).

There are two English sounds which each have more than one I.T.A. letter whose main function is to write them. So whether the sound  is written with the letters "c" or "k" in I.T.A. depends on the way the sound is written in standard English spelling, as also whether the sound  is written with the ordinary "z" letter or with a special backwards "z" letter (which replaces the "s" of standard spelling where it represents a voiced sound, and which visually resembles an angular form of the letter "s"). The backwards "z" occurs prominently in many plural forms of nouns and third-person singular present forms of verbs (including is).

Each of the I.T.A. letters has a name, the pronunciation of which includes the sound that the character stands for. For example, the name of the backwards "z" letter is "zess".

A special typeface was created for the I.T.A., whose characters were all lower case (its letter forms were based on Didone types such as Monotype Modern and Century Schoolbook). Where capital letters are used in standard spelling, the I.T.A. simply used larger versions of the same lower-case characters. The following chart shows the letters of the 44-character version of the I.T.A., with the main pronunciation of each letter indicated by symbols of the International Phonetic Alphabet beneath:

Note that "d" is made more distinctively different from "b" than is usual in standard typefaces.

Later a 45th symbol was added to accommodate accent variation, a form of diaphonemic writing. In the original set, a "hook a" or "two-storey a" (a) was used for the vowel in "cat" (lexical set TRAP), and a "round a" or "one-storey a" (ɑ) for the sound in "father" (lexical set PALM). But lexical set BATH (words such as "rather", "dance", and "half") patterns with PALM in some accents including Received Pronunciation, but with TRAP in others including General American. So a new character, the "half-hook a", was devised, to avoid the necessity of producing separate instructional materials for speakers of different accents.

Decline
Any advantage of the I.T.A. in making it easier for children to learn to read English was often offset by some children not being able to effectively transfer their I.T.A.-reading skills to reading standard English orthography, and/or being generally confused by having to deal with two alphabets in their early years of reading. Certain alternative methods (such as associating sounds with colours, so that for example when the letter "c" writes a  sound it would be coloured with the same colour as the letter "k", but when "c" writes an  sound it could be coloured like "s", as in Words in Colour and Colour Story Reading) were found to have some of the advantages of the I.T.A. without most of the disadvantages.  Though the I.T.A. was not originally intended to dictate one particular approach to teaching reading, it was often identified with phonics methods, and after the 1960s, the pendulum of educational theory swung away from phonics.

The I.T.A. remains of interest in discussions about possible reforms of English spelling. There have been attempts to apply the I.T.A. using only characters which can be found on the typewriter keyboard or in the basic ASCII character set, to avoid the use of special symbols.

See also
 Initial sound table
 International Phonetic Alphabet
 Inventive spelling
 Phonics
 Shavian alphabet
 Unifon

References
Evaluating the Initial Teaching Alphabet: A Study of the Influence of English Orthography in Learning to Read and Write by John Downing and William Latham (1967).

External links
 
 
 
 
 
 "Proposal to Encode Latin characters for Initial Teaching Alphabet"

Phonics
Phonetic alphabets
English spelling reform
Learning
Reading (process)